Carneros Creek is a south by southeastward flowing stream originating in the southernmost Mayacamas Mountains, in Napa County, California.

History
A Mexican land grant named Los Carneros, which is Spanish for "sheep", dates to 1836 (Rancho Rincon de los Carneros) in what is now Napa County. Rancho Rincon de los Carneros, extending northeast from Carneros Creek to the Napa River, was granted to Nicolas Higuera around this time. Higuera also received Rancho Entre Napa, contiguous to the north along the creek. Carneros Creek forms the northeast border of the 1841 Mexican land grant Rancho Huichica which includes most of the Carneros region and Huichica Creek which is west of and parallel to Carneros Creek. Rancho Huichica was granted to Jacob P. Leese the first American pioneer to build a house in San Francisco. In the next year, Antonio Ortega, the Administrator of Mission San Francisco Solano, was granted a large rancho from Napa to Yountville. This area, which extended to Carneros Creek, above Higuera’s grant, was later granted to Salvador Vallejo.

Watershed
The lowest  of the creek is confined within flood levees.

Ecology
Carneros Creek is an anadromous steelhead trout (Oncorhynchus mykiss) stream. Because these trout spend two years in freshwater before returning to the sea, only the perennial middle reach of the creek hosts trout year-round (between Old Sonoma Road and extending upstream about  where the channel goes dry in summer and fall).

See also
 Napa River
 Los Carneros AVA
 Carneros, California
 List of watercourses in the San Francisco Bay Area

References

External links
Oakland Museum Creek Map of Napa River Watershed
Carneros Creek Watershed Assessment and Management Plan 

Rivers of Napa County, California
Rivers of Northern California
Tributaries of Napa River